Charles or Charlie Culver may refer to:

 Charles Vernon Culver (1830–1909), member of the U.S. House of Representatives from Pennsylvania
 Charles Marriot Culver (1934–2015), medical ethicist and psychiatrist
 Charlie Culver (1892–1970), American baseball player